Jodi Felice Jones (born 22 October 1997) is a professional footballer who plays as a winger for Notts County on loan from Oxford United. Born in England, he represents the Malta national team.

Career

Dagenham & Redbridge
Jones was born in Bow, London and started his career with the renowned local junior side Senrab. He later joined the youth system at Dagenham & Redbridge at under-13 level and in the summer of 2014, he started a two-year scholarship with the club. In November 2014, despite still a first-year scholar, he was handed a squad number with the first team ahead of the league fixture against Bury, after he had impressed in an Essex Senior Cup tie win over Concord Rangers. However, he did not make the bench and wasn't included in the first team squad until January 2015, when he was an unused substitute against Cambridge United.He made his first team debut in February 2015, coming on as a last minute substitute for Alex Jakubiak in a 0–0 draw with Portsmouth. In the process he became the youngest Dagenham & Redbridge player to appear in a league game, beating the previous record set by Dominic Green. In March 2015, he signed his first professional contract on a two-year deal until 2017. In April 2015, Jones made his full debut for the Daggers in the 4–0 home win over Accrington Stanley, scoring in the final minute with his first goal for the club.

Coventry City
On 18 March 2016, Jones joined Coventry City on an emergency loan deal with the view to a permanent deal at the end of the season.

After a successful loan spell with Coventry City, Jones signed a four-year deal with the Sky Blues on 10 May 2016 for an undisclosed fee, which will begin on 1 July 2016. He scored his first goal for Coventry in an EFL Trophy tie against Northampton Town on 4 October 2016. He came on as a substitute as Coventry won the 2017 EFL Trophy Final.

On the first day of the 2017–18 league season against Notts County he scored a hat-trick in a 3–0 win. Later on that season, he picked up an injury to his anterior cruciate ligament (ACL), which saw him side-lined for the rest of the 2017–18 season and 2018–19 season.

Oxford United
On 29 July 2022, Jones signed a one-year contract, with the option for a further year, with Oxford United.

Notts County (loan)
On 26 January 2023, Jones signed for National League club Notts County on loan until the end of the season.

International career
Jones was born in England, and is of Maltese descent through his father. On 9 September 2022, he had his first call up to the Malta national team for a set of UEFA Nations League matches. He debuted with Malta in a 2–1 UEFA Nations League loss to Estonia on 23 September 2022.

Career statistics

Honours
Coventry City
Football League Trophy: 2016–17

References

External links

1997 births
Living people
Footballers from Bow, London
Maltese footballers
Malta international footballers
English footballers
English people of Maltese descent
Association football forwards
Dagenham & Redbridge F.C. players
Coventry City F.C. players
Notts County F.C. players
English Football League players
Senrab F.C. players